Studio Mir Co., Ltd. is a South Korean animation studio based in Seoul. Among other works, the studio animated most of the American TV series The Legend of Korra, the fourth season of The Boondocks, the Netflix series Voltron: Legendary Defender, Dota: Dragon's Blood and Kipo and the Age of Wonderbeasts, and films like Big Fish & Begonia, The Witcher: Nightmare of the Wolf and Mortal Kombat Legends: Scorpion's Revenge.

History
Studio Mir was founded in 2010 by Jae-Myung Yu, together with executive director Kwang-il Han and head of business development Seung-wook Lee. Yu had previously worked for 20 years in animation, including as an animation director for the series Avatar: The Last Airbender. He chose the studio's name after the Soviet space station Mir, which inspired him for its "scientific breakthrough and collaborative spirit".

The studio began work with 20 animators on its first project, the Nickelodeon animated series and Avatar sequel The Legend of Korra – an unusually significant contract for a new studio, which it obtained thanks to Yu's long working relationship with the creators of both series, Bryan Konietzko and Michael Dante DiMartino. Apart from the animation itself, Mir worked with Nickelodeon Animation Studio to contribute in Korras pre-production and storyboarding, including its elaborate martial arts choreography. Sometime after the conclusion of The Legend of Korra, former Nickelodeon vice president Mark Taylor worked with Studio Mir to create the animation for the Netflix sci-fi animated series Voltron: Legendary Defender with some of the creative team from Korra.

Very little of the animation Mir contributed to has aired in South Korea – only the first season of Korra had a "very quiet release". Because of this, the studio is little-known domestically, and, as a consequence, the company is focused on international collaborations.

The studio is working on their first original series titled Koji and looking for investors for the project.

Filmography

TV series

Additionally, Studio Mir did edits for the 2014 Disney XD English and Korean dubs of the 2005 series Doraemon.

Films

Shorts

See also
List of animation studios
Korean animation

References

External links
 
 

 
South Korean animation studios
Mass media in Seoul
Mass media companies established in 2010
South Korean companies established in 2010